Metaterpna differens is a moth of the family Geometridae first described by William Warren in 1909. It is found in Xizang, China.

References

Moths described in 1909
Pseudoterpnini